The Andang (Amdang) are an ethnic group of Chad and Sudan who speak the Amdang language. Most Andang are Muslims.

References

External links
Ethnologue report

Ethnic groups in Chad
Ethnic groups in Sudan